Delmer David Baker (May 3, 1892 – September 11, 1973) was an American professional baseball player, coach, and manager. During his time as a player, he spent three years (1914–1916) in Major League Baseball (MLB) as a backup catcher for the Detroit Tigers. As a manager, he led the 1940 Tigers to the American League pennant. He worked as a coach for 20 years for three American League teams, and was known as one of the premier sign stealers of his era. His professional career encompassed half a century in organized baseball.

Player and minor league manager
Born in Sherwood, Oregon, he was raised in neighboring Wilsonville. After graduating from a Portland business college, he took a job in 1909 as a bookkeeper in Wasco, Oregon, where he caught for the town team. In 1911, a scout signed him to a contract with the Spokane Indians of the Class A (equivalent to today's Triple A) Pacific National League, predecessor to the Pacific Coast League (PCL). In 1914 he was promoted to the Detroit Tigers, and played in 172 games over three seasons as a back-up for Oscar Stanage, batting .209 with 63 hits, including nine doubles and four triples. In 1917, the Tigers farmed him out to the PCL's San Francisco Seals. In 1918 he joined the war effort, serving in the US Navy, then returned to the PCL in 1920, this time with the Portland Beavers. After three seasons there, Baker spent a season with the Mobile Bears of the Class A Southern Association, then returned to the PCL for three more seasons with the Oakland Oaks.

After spending most of the 1928 season as player-manager of the Ogden Gunners in the Class C Utah-Idaho League, Baker moved to the Class A Texas League and caught for the Fort Worth Panthers in 1929.  In 1930 he was appointed player-manager of the Beaumont Exporters, a premier Texas League team with some of Detroit's top prospects, including Schoolboy Rowe, Pete Fox, and Hank Greenberg.  The Exporters won 100 games in 1932, then swept the Dallas Steers for the Texas League championship.  When Detroit manager Bucky Harris promoted Rowe, Fox, and Greenberg to the major league level in 1933, he hired Baker to coach third base for the Tigers.

Tigers coach and manager
Baker served as interim manager after Harris resigned with two games to play in the 1933 season, then returned to coaching third base under Harris' replacement, player-manager Mickey Cochrane.  The Tigers won back-to-back AL pennants in 1934 and '35, and their first ever World Series title in 1935.  Baker managed the team again in mid-1936, when Cochrane took a leave of absence due to what was described as a "nervous breakdown"; and again in mid-1937 after Cochrane suffered a fractured skull when he was hit by a pitch.

In 1938, the Tigers compiled an early-season record of 47-51; on August 7, Baker replaced Cochrane as manager. He rallied Detroit to 37 wins in 56 games, enough to finish in the first division, but Detroit slipped to fifth in 1939.

1940 AL pennant

In 1940, the New York Yankees, who had won the AL pennant and the World Series four years running, faltered, leaving the Tigers and the Cleveland Indians to contend for the league title.  On the final day of the season, with the two teams tied, Baker chose obscure rookie pitcher Floyd Giebell to pitch for the pennant against future Hall of Famer Bob Feller.  The Tigers won the game and the pennant, 2–0; but in the World Series, they lost in seven games to the Cincinnati Reds, despite Bobo Newsom's heroic pitching performances.

With World War II on the horizon, the 1941 season was marked by the call to active military service of numerous baseball stars, including Greenberg.  With their star power hitter out of the lineup, and Newsom ineffective, Detroit fell below .500 that season, and again in 1942.  Baker was replaced after the 1942 season by Steve O'Neill.

Later career
Baker returned to the coaching ranks with Cleveland (1943–44) and the Boston Red Sox (1945–48; 1953–60). From 1949–51, he served as skipper of the Sacramento Solons and the San Diego Padres of the Pacific Coast League. In his final season, 1960, Baker managed one last time in the big leagues as Boston's interim pilot from June 8–12 between Billy Jurges' firing and Pinky Higgins' rehiring. Under Baker, the last-place Red Sox won two games and lost five. He retired from the game after his 50th season in baseball, his last day overshadowed by Ted Williams' last game as a player.  Baker died at age 81 in Olmos Park, Texas.

Sign stealing
As a coach and manager, Baker was known for his proficiency at detecting the type of pitch an opposing pitcher was about to deliver and tipping off his team's batter with verbal signals.  He carefully observed each pitcher's idiosyncrasies, looking, he said, "for all the little quirks, details and tell‐tales."  He found that many pitchers concealed the ball poorly before delivery, allowing him to see their grip.  Others telegraphed their curve balls by bending their wrists, or subtly altering their wind‐ups.  "There are also facial telltales. I know pitchers who, when they throw a curve, bite the lip or stick out the tongue," he said.

Tigers shortstop Dick Bartell wrote that the Tigers were unusually successful against Feller in 1940 because Baker was reading all of Feller’s pitches.  Among Detroit hitters, it was said that Greenberg was the biggest beneficiary of Baker's tip-offs, although Greenberg himself said that "the importance of such information ... has been exaggerated."

Another apparent beneficiary was Don Larsen, who wrote in his memoir:

In response, Larsen adopted a "no-windup" delivery, which he used in the 1956 World Series to pitch the only perfect game in Series history, in Game Five.

Managerial record

References

External links

Del Baker at The Deadball Era

1892 births
1973 deaths
Baseball coaches from Oregon
Baseball managers
Baseball players from Oregon
Beaumont Exporters players
Boston Red Sox coaches
Boston Red Sox managers
Cleveland Indians coaches
Detroit Tigers coaches
Detroit Tigers managers
Detroit Tigers players
Fort Worth Panthers players
Helena Senators players
Lincoln Railsplitters players
Major League Baseball bench coaches
Major League Baseball first base coaches
Major League Baseball third base coaches
Mobile Bears players
Oakland Oaks (baseball) players
Ogden Gunners players
People from Sherman County, Oregon
People from Sherwood, Oregon
People from Wilsonville, Oregon
Portland Beavers players
Sacramento Solons managers
San Francisco Seals (baseball) players
Sportspeople from the Portland metropolitan area